FastPass, FastPass+, and MaxPass were virtual queue systems created by the Walt Disney Company to speed up customer access to certain attractions and amenities at the Disney resorts and theme parks. First introduced in late 1999 as a virtual queue, the systems all allowed guests to avoid long lines at the attractions on which the system was installed, freeing them to partake in other attractions during their wait. There was generally no extra fee for the service.

The original FastPass system was still featured except Walt Disney World, which used FastPass+, along with both Shanghai Disneyland and Disneyland Paris, which replaced the FastPass system with a pay-for-use system called Disney Premier Access. The system continued to use a virtual queue where guests are given a paper ticket with a designated time, instructing them when they would arrive at the head of the queue. However, each park had slight variations on the FastPass concept.

On August 18, 2021, it was announced that the FastPass, FastPass+ and MaxPass would officially be retired in favor of the new Disney Genie service in Disneyland and Walt Disney World, which includes a premium Genie+ option for parkgoers to use the "Lightning Lane".

Disneyland

Disneyland Resort featured the original FastPass system alongside MaxPass. Disney's FastPass service was available at no additional charge to all park guests, while MaxPass cost  a day.

MaxPass
On August 30, 2007, the Walt Disney Company filed a patent for using SMS as a way to get and use FastPasses in the park. The patent indicated that guests staying at Disney hotels would be allowed to make early reservations for attractions using their in-room television.

Originally, all the FastPass tickets were free as long as the guests purchased their park tickets. However, on January 11, 2017, Disney announced Disney's MaxPass for the Disneyland Resort. The new system worked in conjunction with the original FastPass system. It was Disney's first premium virtual queue system, costing /day or $75/year upon launch in 2017. On January 6, 2018, Disney increased the price to /day, and /year. It is included with select Disneyland Annual Passports. The system allowed users to receive a FastPass return time on their smartphone through the Disneyland mobile app when they were inside the parks. Guests who bought the MaxPass system were also able to download their PhotoPass pictures for free.

Also, in March 2017, Shanghai Disneyland introduced Disney Premier Access, a similar system to Disney's MaxPass.

FastPass promotions
Throughout the annual Disney Soundsational Summer promotions of 2011–2012, guests staying at any of the three hotels of the Disneyland Resort received two complimentary FastPasses per person. These passes allowed guests to enter the FastPass line of any FastPass attraction (plus The Little Mermaid: Ariel's Undersea Adventure, which does not otherwise offer FastPass) at any time they chose, similar to the Dream FastPass.

Disney FastPass+

FastPass+ allowed guests to reserve and plan a visit in advance to parks at Walt Disney World. Reservations were available for select attractions, Character Greetings, entertainment, and viewing areas for parades and fireworks. The system allowed guests to make reservations up to 60 days in advance, and change at any time. FastPass+ was a reservation and scheduling system, unlike the old paper FastPass system, which was a virtual queuing concept. Additionally, guests were encouraged to reserve FastPass+ sections with their group and were allowed to change the group's FastPass+ reservation. Guests that stayed at an onsite Disney resort could make reservations up to 60 days in advance while all other guests could schedule reservations up to 30 days in advance, assuming tickets were linked to their account. Annual Passholders could hold FastPass+ reservations for up to 7 different days in the 30-day window. If a Passholder stayed at a Disney resort onsite, they also had 60 days to make reservations for the entire length of the stay.

Guests could make three reservations in advance for each day, and all three were required to be at the same theme park. Disney's Animal Kingdom, Epcot, and Disney's Hollywood Studios separated the attractions available for reservation into two tiers. Guests were restricted in the combination of attractions they were able to reserve in these parks to ensure better reservation availability for others at the parks' most popular attractions. Guests had the option to make a further reservation via an in-park kiosk or the My Disney Experience app after they had used their initial three selections subject to availability. They had the option to continue to make further reservations after using each reservation, until all reservation slots had been allocated for the day.

Disney FastPass+ was not operational at Disney World since the parks reopened in July 2020 due to the COVID-19 pandemic. This was cited as due to the need to create proper social distancing.

The system was permanently discontinued and replaced in October 2021 by Lightning Lane.

Other parks
Shanghai Disneyland is moving towards a digital style much like the one used in California. Under the name "Premier Access", the system is believed to be a response to ticket scalping of the physical paper tickets.

Tokyo Disneyland offers the ability to receive a FastPass on mobile phones at no extra charge as an alternative to the more traditional paper FastPass system. 

During summer of 2011–2012 at Disneyland Paris, guests who stayed in the Disneyland Hotel or in club-level accommodations of hotels received an untimed single-use FastPass voucher for each day of their stays, usable any time except between 13:00 and 16:00. Guests in Castle Club accommodations at the Disneyland Hotel or suites in any hotel instead received a VIP FastPass, which could be used repeatedly for the full length of stay with no time restrictions. In each case, the FastPass was usable only on rides with FastPass facilities. This offer was retained until 2020, at which point it was retired.

Hong Kong Disneyland additionally offers a service called Disney Priority Special and Priority Special+.

See also
 Disney PhotoPass
 E ticket
 Fast Lane, a virtual queue system for the Cedar Fair parks
 Universal Express Pass, a virtual queue system for the Universal parks
 Flash Pass, a virtual queue system for the Six Flags parks
 MyMagic+, the overall system that FastPass+ is a part of
 Fast Lane (E-ZPass) & E-ZPass,  an  electronic toll collection system used on toll roads, toll bridges, and toll tunnels that offers a "Fast Pass" lane

Notes

References

Further reading

 
 
  – Patent for the Fastpass system
 

Walt Disney Parks and Resorts
Fastpass
Payment systems
Queue management